The National Assembly is the parliament of Hungary. The unicameral body consists of 199 (386 between 1990 and 2014) members elected to 4-year terms. Election of members is done using a semi-proportional representation:  a mixed-member majoritarian representation with partial compensation via transfer votes and mixed single vote; involving single-member districts and one list vote; parties must win at least 5% of the popular vote in order to gain list seats assembly. The Assembly includes 25 standing committees to debate and report on introduced bills and to supervise the activities of the ministers. The Constitutional Court of Hungary has the right to challenge legislation on the grounds of constitutionality. The assembly has met in the Hungarian Parliament Building in Budapest since 1902.

The current members are the members of the National Assembly of Hungary (2022–2026).

History 
The Diet of Hungary was a legislative institution in the medieval kingdom of Hungary from the 1290s, and in its successor states, Royal Hungary and the Habsburg kingdom of Hungary throughout the Early Modern period. The name of the legislative body was originally "Parlamentum" during the Middle Ages, the "Diet" expression gained mostly in the Early Modern period. It convened at regular intervals with interruptions during the period of 1527 to 1918, and again until 1946.

The articles of the 1790 diet set out that the diet should meet at least once every 3 years, but, since the diet was called by the Habsburg monarchy, this promise was not kept on several occasions thereafter. As a result of the Austro-Hungarian Compromise, it was reconstituted in 1867.

The Latin term Natio Hungarica ("Hungarian nation") was used to designate the political elite which had participation in the diet, consisting of the nobility, the Catholic clergy, and a few enfranchised burghers,  regardless of language or ethnicity.  Natio Hungarica was a geographic, institutional and juridico-political category.

The democratic character of the Hungarian parliament was reestablished with the fall of the Iron Curtain and the end of the communist dictatorship in 1989. Today's parliament is still called the Országgyűlés, as in royal times, but is called the 'National Assembly' to distance itself from the historical royal diet.

Latest election

Turnout

Results by party

Speakers of the National Assembly of Hungary

Historical composition of the National Assembly since 1990

Members (since 1990)

References

External links
 Official website
 Official website

 
1989 establishments in Hungary
Hungary